Stalindorfer emes ('Stalindorf Truth') was a Yiddish language newspaper published from Stalindorf (a Jewish agricultural settlement founded in 1930 in the Ukrainian SSR) throughout the 1930s. Stalindorfer emes was the organ of the Stalindorf raikom of the Communist Party (bolsheviks) of Ukraine, the Stalindorf Raion Executive Community and the Stalindorf Raion Collective Agriculture Union. It was published three times a week.

References

1930 establishments in Ukraine
1940 disestablishments in Ukraine
Defunct newspapers published in Ukraine
Publications disestablished in 1940
Newspapers established in 1930
Secular Jewish culture in Ukraine
Yiddish communist newspapers
Yiddish culture in Ukraine